The Euskal Herriko Futbol Txapelketa (Basque Country Football Championship) is a regional football friendly competition run by Euskal Herria Kirola (Basque Country Sport). It is contested by teams from the Basque Country that play in La Liga.

It was first played in the 2016–17 season.

Format 

In the regular season, the scores of the games in La Liga played between the region's teams ('Basque football derbies') are used to create the standings. The best two teams qualify for the final, played in a neutral stadium.

List of finals

Top goalscorers
Minimum of 5 goals in total for inclusion on list.

2016–17
There were five eligible clubs and 20 fixtures between them in the 2016–17 La Liga campaign.

Relevant matches

Table

Final

2017–18
There were four eligible clubs and 12 fixtures between them in the 2017–18 La Liga campaign.

Relevant matches

Table

Final

2018–19
There were four eligible clubs and 12 fixtures between them in the 2018–19 La Liga campaign.

Relevant matches

Table

Final

2019–20
There were five eligible clubs and 20 fixtures between them in the 2019–20 La Liga campaign (Osasuna were promoted as winners of the 2018–19 Segunda División, while the top-tier teams all finished in mid-table within 6 points of one another). During pre-season, the clubs came to an agreement that they would all charge away supporters a maximum of €25 for derby match tickets, following previous years where increased prices were being charged by some.

Relevant matches

Table

Final

2020–21
There were five eligible clubs and 20 fixtures between them in the 2020–21 La Liga campaign.

Relevant matches

Notes

Table

Final

2021–22
There were four eligible clubs and 12 fixtures between them in the 2021–22 La Liga campaign.

Relevant matches

Table

Final

See also
 Copa Euskal Herria (women's football)
 Supercopa de Catalunya

References 

 
Football in the Basque Country (autonomous community)
Basque football competitions
Football cup competitions in Spain
Spanish football friendly trophies
Recurring sporting events established in 2016
2016 establishments in Spain